Bermudian is an unincorporated community in Adams and York counties, Pennsylvania, United States.

The village was laid out as Mechanicsville, or Braggtown by Joseph Griest.

References

Unincorporated communities in Adams County, Pennsylvania
Unincorporated communities in York County, Pennsylvania
Unincorporated communities in Pennsylvania